Xojeli district (Karakalpak: Хожели районы, Xojeli rayonı) is a district in the Republic of Karakalpakstan. The capital lies at the city Xojeli. In 2017, a part of its territory was givent for the creation of new Taqiyatas district.

There is one city Xojeli, one town Vodnik and seven rural communities Ámudarya, Jańajap, Qalap, Garezsizlik, Qumjiqqin, Sarishunkól, Samankól.

References

Karakalpakstan
Districts of Uzbekistan